The 1982 Minnesota House of Representatives election was held in the U.S. state of Minnesota on November 2, 1982, to elect members to the House of Representatives of the 73rd Minnesota Legislature. A primary election was held on September 14, 1982.

The Minnesota Democratic–Farmer–Labor Party (DFL) won a majority of seats, remaining the majority party, followed by the Independent-Republicans of Minnesota. The new Legislature convened on January 4, 1983.

Results

See also
 Minnesota Senate election, 1982
 Minnesota gubernatorial election, 1982

References

1982 Minnesota elections
Minnesota
Minnesota House of Representatives elections